The Saturno World Tour is the fourth concert tour by Puerto Rican singer Rauw Alejandro in support of his third studio album, Saturno (2022). It began on 18 February 2023 in Santo Domingo, Dominican Republic, and is scheduled to end on 3 October 2023 in Munich, Germany, comprising 57 shows.

Shows

References

2023 concert tours
Concert tours of North America
Concert tours of the United States
Concert tours of Mexico
Concert tours of Spain
Concert tours of Europe